Gaël Monfils was the defending champion and successfully defended his title, defeating Félix Auger-Aliassime in the final, 6–2, 6–4.

Seeds

Draw

Finals

Top half

Bottom half

Qualifying

Seeds

Qualifiers

Qualifying draw

First qualifier

Second qualifier

Third qualifier

Fourth qualifier

References

External links
 Main draw
 Qualifying draw

Singles